Events in the year 2018 in Peru.

Incumbents
 President: Pedro Pablo Kuczynski (until 23 March), Martín Vizcarra (since 23 March)
 First Vice President: Martín Vizcarra (until 23 March)
 Prime Minister: Mercedes Aráoz

Events 
2 January – The 2018 Pasamayo bus crash, killing at least 48.
14 January – A 7.1 magnitude earthquake struck Peru.
23 March – First Vice President Martín Vizcarra becomes new President of Peru after resignation of President Pedro Pablo Kuczynski.

Publications 
 José Sabogal Wiesse: Agricultura tradicional yunga (Yunga traditional agriculture).

Story 
 Gabriela Cuba Espinoza: Sólo humanos (Only human).

Anthology 
 Gloria Mendoza Borda (anthologist): Un otoño azul (A blue autumn).

Cinema 
 Todos somos marineros (We are all sailors) by Miguel Ángel Moulet.

Deaths

17 January – Augusto Polo Campos, composer (b. 1932)
19 February – Hernán Alzamora, hurdler, (b. 1927)
19 February – Daniel Peredo, sports journalist (b. 1969)
27 March – José Hugo Garaycoa Hawkins, Roman Catholic bishop (b. 1930)
5 April – Jaime Thorne León, politician, Minister of Defense (2010–2011) (b. 1943).
 16 July – Jaime Guardia, charango player (b. 1933)
 27 July – Marco Aurelio Denegri, Peruvian television host and sexologist (b. 1938)

References

 
2010s in Peru
Years of the 21st century in Peru
Peru
Peru